Khin Maung Lay (born 13 November 1941) is a Burmese dentist who served as Rector of the University of Dental Medicine, Yangon from 1983 to 1992. He was the second president of the Myanmar Dental Association (MDA) from 1985 to 1995.

Early life and education
Khin Maung Lay was born on 13 November 1941 in Rangoon, Myanmar. He graduated from the University of Medicine 1, Yangon in July 1961, and received an M.D.S. from England in 1963.

See also
 Myanmar Dental Association
 Myanmar Dental Council
 University of Dental Medicine, Mandalay
 University of Dental Medicine, Yangon

References

Burmese dental professors
1941 births
Living people
People from Yangon
University of Medicine 1, Yangon alumni